The Agdlek-class cutter is a ship class of cutters built for and operated by the Royal Danish Navy for patrol duty in the waters of Greenland. The cutters were replaced one for one with the much larger .

Normally two vessels will be on station, while the third would be on its way to, returning from, or being serviced in its homeport, back in Denmark.

List of ships

External links
Danish site describing the Agdlek class

Patrol boat classes